Optical Disc Archive is a proprietary storage technology that was introduced by Sony. It uses removable cartridges, where each cartridge holds 11 optical discs.  Each of the internal optical discs is similar to, but not compatible with, a Blu-ray disc. The latest version of the cartridge, that has a total capacity of about 5.5TB, uses discs that hold about 500GB each. The technology was publicly announced  on 16 April 2012 during the NAB Show with the first units shipping in February 2013.

In 2020, the third generation of cartridges that has more storage capacity was launched.

Media

Hardware 

*Depending on configuration.

Roadmap 

Generation 3 of the Optical Disc Archive technology was announced for early-2020 release.  Generation 3 increased the cartridge capacity to 5.5TB, the read speed to 375MB/s and the write speed (with verification on) to 187.5MB/s.

Media roadmap 

Sony Corporation and Panasonic Corporation on announced on 10 March 2014 their cooperation in producing a new media trademarked as Archival disc.  The Archival disc media will be used in future Optical Disc Archive Media to achieve at least 6TB of storage.

See also
 Archival Disc

References

Sony hardware
Optical computer storage media